Sara Camara (born 18 June 1940) is an athlete from Mali

He started at the Summer Olympics 1964 in Tokyo in Men's 100 metres. He finished seventh and last in his heat in the first round.

References

1940 births
Living people
Malian male sprinters
Athletes (track and field) at the 1964 Summer Olympics
Olympic athletes of Mali
21st-century Malian people